The 1998 Mercedes Cup was a men's tennis tournament played on Clay in Stuttgart, Germany, that was part of the International Series Gold of the 1998 ATP Tour. It was the fiftieth edition of the tournament and was held 20 July – 26 July.

Seeds
Champion seeds are indicated in bold text while text in italics indicates the round in which those seeds were eliminated.

Draw

Finals

Top half

Bottom half

References

Doubles
Doubles 1998